The 2006 Samsung/Radio Shack 500, the seventh race of the 2006 NASCAR Nextel Cup season, was held at Texas Motor Speedway on April 9, 2006. Kasey Kahne became the first driver to win at Texas from the pole.

Qualifying

Race results

Failed to qualify: Brent Sherman (#49), Chad Blount (#92), Kenny Wallace (#78), Chad Chaffin (#34), Stanton Barrett (#95).

References

 Official results

Samsung Radio Shack 500
Samsung Radio Shack 500
21st century in Fort Worth, Texas
NASCAR races at Texas Motor Speedway
Samsung/Radio Shack 500